Vieille-Chapelle is a commune in the Pas-de-Calais department in the Hauts-de-France region of France.

Geography
The river Lawe flows through the commune.

Population

Places of interest
 Ruins of a medieval castle.
 The church of Notre-Dame, rebuilt along with much of the village, after World War I.
 The war memorial.
 The Commonwealth War Graves Commission cemeteries.

See also
Communes of the Pas-de-Calais department

References

External links

 The CWGC graves in the commune’s cemetery
 The CWGC military cemetery

Vieillechapelle